David C. Hennessy (1858 – October 16, 1890) was a police chief of New Orleans, Louisiana. As a young detective, he made headlines in 1881 when he captured a notorious Italian criminal, Giuseppe Esposito. In 1888, he was promoted to superintendent and chief of police. While in office he made a number of improvements to the force, and was well known and respected in the New Orleans community.

His assassination in 1890 led to a sensational trial. A series of acquittals and mistrials angered locals, and an enormous mob formed outside the prison the next day. The prison doors were forced open and 11 of the 19 Italian men who had been indicted for Hennessy's murder were lynched. The March 14, 1891 lynchings were the largest known mass lynching in U.S. history.

Early life
David C. Hennessy was born into an Irish Catholic family, son of Margaret and David Hennessy Sr., at 275 Girod St., New Orleans. David Sr. was a member of the First Louisiana Cavalry of the Union Army during the U.S. Civil War, formed after the state was occupied by Union troops. After the war, during the Reconstruction era, he served with the Metropolitan Police, a New Orleans force under the authority of the governor of Louisiana. Local white Democrats generally considered the Metropolitan Police as a military occupation army, in part because it protected the right of freedmen to vote, in accordance with the Fifteenth Amendment. David Sr. was murdered in 1869 by Arthur Guerin, a fellow policeman.

Career

Hennessy joined the New Orleans police force as a messenger in 1870. While only a teenager, he caught two adult thieves in the act, beat them with his bare hands, and dragged them to the police station. He made detective at the age of 20.

With his cousin Michael Hennessy and private detectives James Mooney and John Boland of New York City, he arrested the notorious Italian bandit and fugitive Giuseppe Esposito in 1881. Esposito was wanted in Italy for kidnapping a British tourist and cutting off his ear, among numerous other crimes. Esposito was deported to Italy, where he was given a life sentence.

In 1882, Hennessy was tried for the murder of New Orleans Chief of Detectives Thomas Devereaux. At the time, both men were candidates for the position of chief. Hennessy argued self-defense and was found not guilty. Hennessy left the department afterwards and joined a private security firm given police powers by the city. He handled security for the New Orleans World Fair of 1884–1885. The New York Times noted that Hennessy's men were, "neatly uniformed and are a fine-looking and intelligent body of men, far superior to the regular city force."

In 1888, Joseph A. Shakspeare, the nominee of the Young Men's Democratic Association, was elected mayor of New Orleans with Republican support. Having promised to end police inefficiency, Shakspeare promptly appointed Hennessy as his police chief.

Hennessy inherited a police force that was (according to the local press) incompetent and plagued by corruption. Under his supervision, it began to show signs of improvement.

Assassination

On the evening of October 15, 1890, Hennessy was shot by several gunmen as he walked home from work.
It is likely that the gunmen were wielding sawn-off shotguns — known in Italian terms as lupara — a common type of execution among Mafiosi. Hennessy returned fire and chased his attackers before collapsing. When asked who had shot him, Hennessy reportedly whispered to Captain William O'Connor: "Dagos." Hennessy was awake in the hospital for several hours after the shooting and spoke to friends but did not name the shooters. The next day, he died from complications related to his injuries.

There had been an ongoing feud between the Provenzano and Mantranga families, who were business rivals on the New Orleans waterfront. Hennessy had put several of the Provenzanos in prison, and their appeal trial was coming up. According to some reports, Hennessy had been planning to offer new evidence at the trial to clear the Provenzanos and implicate the Mantrangas. That would mean that the Mantrangas, not the Provenzanos, had a motive for the murder. A policeman, a friend of Hennessy, later testified that Hennessy had told him he had no such plans. In any case, it was widely believed that Hennessy's killers were Italian. Local papers such as the Times-Democrat and the Daily Picayune freely blamed "Dagoes" for the murder. Various newspaper accounts of the era linked Hennessy's murder to Esposito and the Mafia.

Aftermath

Hennessy had been popular in New Orleans, and the pressure to catch his killers was intense. The police responded by arresting dozens of local Italians. Eventually 19 men were indicted for the murder and held without bail in the Parish Prison. The following March, nine of the accused men were tried. A series of acquittals and mistrials angered locals, and an enormous mob formed outside the prison the next day. The prison doors were forced open and 11 of the men were lynched. The incident strained U.S.-Italian relations for a time, but was eventually settled with a cash indemnity.

Press coverage of the assassination and lynching was sensational and anti-Italian in tone, and generally would not meet modern journalistic standards. It was almost universally assumed that the lynched men were Mafia assassins who had deserved their fate. Since then, many historians have questioned this assumption.

The lynchings were the subject of the 1999 HBO movie Vendetta, starring Christopher Walken. The movie is based on a 1977 book by Richard Gambino. 

On November 24, 1893, John Williams, an African-American, was sentenced to life in prison for the rape of the 10-year-old, Rafael D'Amico. Williams was one of the state witnesses in the Hennessy murder trial. Joseph Shakspeare had ordered the sentence.

Hennessy is buried in Metairie Cemetery, New Orleans.

Louisiana songwriter Fred Bessel published a bestselling song about Hennessy in 1891, titled "The Hennessy Murder." It begins:

Kind friends if you will list to me a sad story I'll relate,
'Tis of the brave Chief Hennessy and how he met his fate
On that quiet Autumn Evening when all nature seemed at rest,
This good man was shot to death; may his soul rest with the blest.

References

Sources

External links

 "Shot Down at His Door; The Chief of the New-Orleans Police Brutally Murdered"; The New York Times, October 17, 1890
 "Crimes of the Mafias. The Suspected Assassins of Chief Hennessy"; The New York Times, October 20, 1890
 "Indictments Found at Last; The New-Orleans Grand Jury Acts on Chief Hennessy's Murder"; The New York Times, November 22, 1890
 "Chief Hennessy Avenged; Eleven of His Italian Assassins Lynched by a Mob"; The New York Times, March 15, 1891
 "Signor Corte's Farewell; His Story of the Lynching of the Italians"; The New York Times, May 24, 1891
 crescentcity lynchings
 Persico, Joseph E., "Vendetta in New Orleans"; American Heritage Magazine, June 1973

1858 births
1890 deaths
1890 murders in the United States
Chiefs of the New Orleans Police Department
History of racism in Louisiana
American people of Irish descent
Assassinated American people
Assassinated police officers
Male murder victims
Deaths by firearm in Louisiana
People murdered in Louisiana
People in 19th-century Louisiana
American Roman Catholics